It's a Matter of Love is a 2011 Sri Lankan English romantic comedy film directed by Roy de Silva and produced by his wife Sumana Amarasinghe. It stars Anarkali Akarsha and Saranga Disasekara in lead roles along with Vijaya Nandasiri and Lucky Dias. It is the sequel to 1990 film It's a Matter of Time, which is Sri Lanka's first English film directed by a Sinhalese director.

The film marks the debut acting of popular actor Ronnie Leitch's daughter, Keishiya Leitch. The movie premiered at LA’s Vista cinema hall and then screened in other theaters around the country.

Cast
 Anarkali Akarsha as Natasha
 Saranga Disasekara as Malan
 Vijaya Nandasiri as Robert
 Lucky Dias as Malan's father
 Rosy Senanayake as Natasha's mother
 Iranganie Serasinghe as Chathuri's grandmother
 Ronnie Leitch as Jennifer's father
 Nehara Pieris as Jennifer
 Corrine Almeida as Jennifer's mother
 Keishiya Leitch as Chathuri
 Sudharshana Bandara as Shaun
 Sumana Amarasinghe

References

External links
 

2011 films
Sinhala-language films
2011 romantic comedy films
Sri Lankan romantic comedy films
2010s English-language films